The  2D2 5500  were electric locomotives operated by the Compagnie du chemin de fer de Paris à Orléans, then SNCF in France, in operation from 1933 to 1980.

Design and operation 

This class originated on the PO with the two  class locomotives of 1925. These had four traction motors, one per axle, driving through Buchli drives and following Swiss practice. They were considered to be more reliable in service than other PO electric locos.

The locomotives operated from a  catenary with two pantographs, powering four  motors. Rheostatic braking was also possible, with the rotors connected in series and shunt resistances across each field winding. Engineers watched the line ahead through a circular frosted lens in the windshield.

Thirty five units were ordered by the PO to run on its newly electrified Paris-Orleans-Toulouse/Bordeaux lines, numbers 503 to 537, delivered between 1933 and 1935. The next 15 locomotives were delivered until 1943 to the PO.

The units travelled  between overhauls. They were known to be very low vibration locomotives.

Service history 

Preservation 
2D2 5516 is preserved at Cite du Train.

Notes

Standard gauge electric locomotives of France
SNCF locomotives
2′Do2′ locomotives
1500 V DC locomotives
Fives-Lille locomotives
CEM locomotives
Passenger locomotives
E.0501